"Pocketful of Rainbows" is a song from the 1960 Elvis Presley album, G.I. Blues, written by Fred Wise and Ben Weisman.

Song information
The song was recorded on May 6, 1960, at RCA Victors Hollywood studios for his 1960 film G. I. Blues.

In the film version Juliet Prowse (who lip-synched to Loulie Jean Norman's voice) can be seen singing along with Elvis in a cable car in the small German tourist-town Rüdesheim am Rhein 

In the 1996 movie Jerry Maguire, the director Cameron Crowe used an alternate version of "Pocketful of Rainbows", slightly faster than the original one used in G.I. Blues.

Other versions
Jimmy Breedlove of The Ravens. Released on CD 2, "The Demos", that came with the book "Writing for the King" in 2006. It was released on the Follow That Dream label.
 The song appears on the 1966 Jan & Dean project that was eventually released by Sundazed Records as Save For A Rainy Day in 1996.
Revived by Australian singer Colin Cook on the Clarion label (MCK-1630) in 1967

Covered by Japanese technopop group YMO in 1993.

Canadian Country star Ray Condo recorded a version also

Covered by Glenn Danzig on Danzig Sings Elvis in 2020, on Cleopatra Records

References

Elvis Presley songs
Songs with lyrics by Fred Wise (songwriter)
1960 songs
Songs with music by Ben Weisman
Songs written for films